James Barrigan (born 25 January 1998) is an English footballer who plays as a midfielder for Marine.

Club career
Ahead of the 2016–17 EFL Championship season he signed a professional contract with  the senior team.

Barrigan made his senior team debut in an EFL Cup match against Oldham Athletic as a 70th-minute substitute for Will Grigg.

Wigan offered to elongate his contract by one year in April 2017.

In 2019, he joined Marine and he was appointed vice-captain of the club in December 2021.

He left Marine for Warrington Rylands in the summer of 2022 but rejoined Marine on loan in September 2022. He then signed permanently for Marine again in February 2023.

Career statistics

References

Living people
1998 births
English footballers
Association football forwards
Wigan Athletic F.C. players
Warrington Town F.C. players
Chorley F.C. players
Skelmersdale United F.C. players
Marine F.C. players